Anni Huotari (13 July 1874, Viipuri – 15 April 1943; née Torvelainen) was a Finnish politician. She was a Member of the Parliament of Finland from 1907 to 1910, from 1911 to 1918, from 1922 to 1927 and again from 1932 until her death in 1943. Anni Huotari was imprisoned from 1918 to 1919 for having sided with the Reds during the Finnish Civil War. She was married to Anton Huotari.

References

1874 births
1943 deaths
Politicians from Vyborg
People from Viipuri Province (Grand Duchy of Finland)
Social Democratic Party of Finland politicians
Members of the Parliament of Finland (1907–08)
Members of the Parliament of Finland (1908–09)
Members of the Parliament of Finland (1909–10)
Members of the Parliament of Finland (1911–13)
Members of the Parliament of Finland (1913–16)
Members of the Parliament of Finland (1916–17)
Members of the Parliament of Finland (1917–19)
Members of the Parliament of Finland (1922–24)
Members of the Parliament of Finland (1924–27)
Members of the Parliament of Finland (1930–33)
Members of the Parliament of Finland (1933–36)
Members of the Parliament of Finland (1936–39)
Members of the Parliament of Finland (1939–45)
Women members of the Parliament of Finland
People of the Finnish Civil War (Red side)
Prisoners and detainees of Finland
Finnish people of World War II
20th-century Finnish women politicians